Andelfingen is a railway station in the Swiss canton of Zurich and municipality of Andelfingen. It is located on the Rheinfall line and is served by Zurich S-Bahn lines S12, S24, and S33.

References

External links 
 

Andelfingen
Andelfingen